The Mackerras New South Wales election pendulum, 2005 shows the state of the major political parties ahead of the 2007 New South Wales state election. The table shows seats in the New South Wales Legislative Assembly arranged in the form of a Mackerras pendulum. The figures have been calculated on the basis of a redistribution completed in 2005.

A uniform swing against the incumbent Labor Party government would deliver seats on the left of the table to the opposition Liberal and National parties. A swing in the government's favour would deliver seats on the right of the table to Labor.

MPs shown in italics did not contest the 2007 election.

Very safe seats

Safe seats

Fairly safe seats

Marginal seats

Independents 
A version of the table published in The Australian on 19 February 2007 showed all seats as effectively Coalition or Labor depending on the favoured major party among the electorate's voters. On this interpretation, Clover Moore's seat of Sydney is shown on the government side, alone among the seven sitting independents.

Notes 

Pendulums for New South Wales state elections